Sommerfeld is a large lunar impact crater that is located in the far northern latitudes of the Moon. It lies on the far side, and can only be viewed from orbit. To the south of Sommerfeld is Rowland, a crater about the same size as Sommerfeld. Southeast of Sommerfeld is the huge walled plain Birkhoff.

This crater belongs to a class of lunar features sometimes termed a walled plain – that is, it consists of a relatively flat interior surrounded by a ring mountain. The outer rim is only moderately eroded and it retains some traces of a terrace structure, albeit softened and rounded. Several small craterlets lie along the rim edge and inner wall along the south and southeast. A merged pair of small craters is attached to the southern outer rim. The inner wall is slightly wider along the eastern side, perhaps from deposits of ejecta from nearby impacts.

The interior floor of Sommerfeld is a nearly level plain that has most likely smoothed out through deposits of materials. There are some small craters on the eastern edge of the interior. There is no central peak complex, and only a small hill lies at the midpoint.

Satellite craters
By convention these features are identified on lunar maps by placing the letter on the side of the crater midpoint that is closest to Sommerfeld.

References

 
 
 
 
 
 
 
 
 
 
 
 

Impact craters on the Moon